Raymond Guy Woods (born 7 June 1965) is a footballer who played as a winger in the Football League for Tranmere Rovers, Wigan Athletic, Coventry City and Shrewsbury Town.

Career
Born in Birkenhead, Woods made his professional debut for Tranmere Rovers.

After being released by Tranmere, Woods dropped into non-league football, and had brief spells at Bangor City, Runcorn and Northwich Victoria before joining Caernarfon Town. He was a key player in the team which reached the third round of the 1986–87 FA Cup.

After a spell with Colne Dynamoes, Woods returned to professional football with Wigan Athletic. In January 1991, Woods played for Wigan in a FA Cup tie against First Division side Coventry City, and set up Latics equaliser to force a replay, which Wigan lost 0–1. He impressed in both games, persuading City manager Terry Butcher to sign Woods for a fee of £200,000 shortly afterwards.

Woods went on to play for Shrewsbury Town before finishing his career with Telford United and Worcester City.

After retiring as a player, Woods was appointed as a Youth Development Officer at Worcester City in 2001. He remained involved with the club's youth programme until 2010.

References

Living people
Tranmere Rovers F.C. players
1965 births
Sportspeople from Birkenhead
English footballers
Association football midfielders
English Football League players
Caernarfon Town F.C. players
Colne Dynamoes F.C. players
Wigan Athletic F.C. players
Coventry City F.C. players
Shrewsbury Town F.C. players